Labu Rahman is a Bangladeshi notable musician, singer, songwriter, and composer. He is one of the senior guitarists in Bangladesh who played guitar with many prominent singers of Bangladesh. His current band is 'Feedback' which is also one of the old and famous music bands in Bangladesh. Labu Rahman has also many guitar students who are playing guitar in many famed music bands.

Career 
He started playing guitar in 1973. He joined the band Ananda in 1975. In 1977 he joined Uccharon, the band of Azam Khan.During playing guitar with 'Azam Khan', he wrote and composed a hit song 'Ami Jare Chaire Se thake Morei Ontore'.  He stayed for a couple of years with Azam khan, and in 1980 he started playing in the band Symphony at the Merry Anderson floating restaurant in Pagla near Narayanganj. By this time, he had become a professional musician, playing in orchestras as a session musician in Dhaka, as well as touring internationally with national artists of Bangladesh.

He joined the band Feedback in 1986, and created many memorable songs with the band. He works with the band as lead guitarist and secondary vocalist. As a singer he has some popular songs along with Feedback, and his few popular songs are : "Bidrohi" , " Chotto Pakhi" ,"Ei Bisshew". He is still making music for his audiences and fans.

Discography

Solo
 Bheja Ki Noyon
 I Wish
 Cocaine

Mixed
 Rongomela Vol.1
 Together
 Kiron
 Adda
 6 Band Mixed '99
 Aloron
 Millennium

Band (Feedback)

 উল্লাস (Cheers) (1987)
 মেলা (Carnival) (1990)
 বংগাব্দ ১৪০০ (Bengali Year 1400) (1994)
 বাউলিয়ানা (Bauliana) (1996)
 দেহঘড়ি (Body clock) (1997)
 ০২ (02)

Composition
 Tumi Megh Hole

References

External links
 Labu Rahman channel on YouTube.
 Labu Rahman second channel on YouTube.

Bangladeshi guitarists
Bangladeshi male musicians
1958 births
Living people